Franz Lambert (born 11 March 1948) is a German composer and organist. He is an avid Hammond organ player; however, he is more noted in later years for playing the Wersi range of electronic organs. During his career he has released over 100 albums.

Born in Heppenheim, Germany, his first notable public appearance was in 1969 in the German TV show Zum Blauen Bock, after which he received his first publishing contract. He has played for several celebrities, including Prince Charles and Helmut Schmidt.

One of his works is the "FIFA Anthem", which was first played at the 1994 FIFA World Cup. It continues to be played at all FIFA-organized games and tournaments when the teams enter the pitch.

Franz Lambert lives with his wife and two children in Heppenheim-Sonderbach, Hesse, Germany.

Discography

1969-1980

1981–1990

1991–2000

since 2001

See also 
FIFA Anthem

External links
www.franzlambert.de (English)

1948 births
Living people
People from Bergstraße (district)
German organists
German male organists
German composers
21st-century organists
21st-century German male musicians